A by-election was held for the New South Wales Legislative Assembly electorate of Vaucluse on 29 August 1936 because of the death of United Australia Party member William Foster. The election was a contest between sons of politicians and both supported the UAP. The pre-selected UAP candidate was Hugh Foster, the son of the former member, while Murray Robson, the son of a long serving NSW UAP politician, William Robson, ran as an independent, having been an active supporter of the UAP, stating in his campaign that "I am a supporter of the UAP and of the Government".

Dates

Results

William Foster died.

See also
Electoral results for the district of Vaucluse
List of New South Wales state by-elections

References

1936 elections in Australia
New South Wales state by-elections
1930s in New South Wales